Ramjas School is a senior secondary four-section school in New Delhi, India, affiliated with the CBSE. It was founded by Ram Kunwar Gupta, Founder of Mahavir Book Depot and P.Chand Publishers and Company in 1971 and was also its first Chairman. His company is a famous book publisher in India. The school is funded and run by the Ramjas Foundation.

The Principal of Ramjas School Pusa Road is Mrs. Surabhi Dua. The Manager of this school is Atam Prakash Aggarwal, who is brother of former Congress M.P Jai Prakash Aggarwal whereas Shubhra Gupta is the chairperson.

The school was established by the Ramjas Foundation in 1971. It is a co-educational English medium school, located on Pusa Road. It is recognised by the Directorate of Education, Delhi. Ramjas is a four-section school from classes VI to XII. The school has about 1,047 students and 46 teachers. The school offers a wide range of courses at the +2 level in all the three streams, namely Science, Commerce and Humanities.

Classes are primarily taught in English. Other languages used are Hindi, Sanskrit and Spanish. The school is criticized for using chit method to allot students Sanskrit or Spanish language.

After Class 10th students can choose either science, commerce or humanities as their stream for further studies.

Admission

Admission is given in 6th Class. Children from Ramjas Primary Schools are given priority in admissions. There are 3 ways to get admission in the school.

1. Ramjas Student – Students who earlier studied in Ramjas Foundation Schools until 5th Class and secure a good percentage in 5th Class can get admission easily. Maijority of students are admitted on this basis.

Primary schools of Ramjas Foundation (5th)

Ramjas Nursery Primary School, Darya Ganj

Ramjas Primary School, P. K. Road

Ramjas Nursery Primary School, Ballimaran

Babu Ram Happy School, Kucha Pati Ram

The seats are given on basis marks in 5th Standard. The cutoff is relatively normal as only students who have studied till 5th Class in Ramjas Primary Schools can get admission. 

2. Selected in EWS/PwD List of Delhi Government – 25% seats are reserved for EWS category children in all private schools. If child is disabled, then also there is reservation. Every year Govt opens portal for these registrations.Apply Here

3. Entrance exam : The seats that are vacant are given by an entrance exam.

Fees
The school charges Rs.200 in admission fees for new students. Average fees per student is around Rs.95,000($1189)per year.Other than that there are various other donations and funds that a student is forced to pay, for e.g Library Fee, Rai Kedar Nath Fund etc.

The monthly fees of Ramjas School Pusa Road is around Rs.8000 per month.

Controversy
In 2015, a petition was filed in Delhi High Court against the school for denying admission to a child in  6th Standard by adopting a screening procedure illegal under RTE Act. According to parent, his child was denied because he was critical of the school management and admission was not given despite circular issued by Ramjas Primary School Daryaganj and PTA Committee.

There have been multiple allegations against school staff on public forums of corporal punishment, shaming and exploitation. Despite this, the school does not take any action and has no mechanism to redress them.

Despite DTC charging only 60-75 rupees per kilometer, the school charges around Rs.2000 per student. School dress is changed frequently so that it is unavailable in market and can be purchased from school only. Textbooks and copies are changed every year and there is a separate Unit Test register for every subject.

School activities include music, dance, arts, table tennis, volleyball, basketball, and computers.The ground is too small for playing. Moreover, the coaches charge large amount of money from students. Table tennis, football, basketball and badminton is all packed in a small area.

Former Principal of the School, Mohini Bindra joined the Management of The Indian Heights School, in Dwarka a school founded by Arya Book Depot, a famous publisher of school books in Delhi. The school is currently run by Bhagwati Devi Foundation.

Shubhra Gupta, the School's chairperson is married to Dev Mohan Gupta who is involved in Defense business in India. Her son Sushen M Gupta was allegedly accused of corruption in Augusta Westland bribery scandal.

See also
Ramjas School, R. K. Puram

References

External links 
 

High schools and secondary schools in Delhi
New Delhi
Schools in Delhi
Educational institutions in India